Monaro, once frequently spelt "Manaro", or in early years of settlement "Maneroo" (an interpretation of a First Nations word for big plain,)  is a region in the south of New South Wales, Australia. A small area of Victoria near Snowy River National Park is geographically part of the Monaro. While the Australian Capital Territory is not considered part of the region, some towns in the Monaro have close links with Canberra.

The Snowy Monaro Regional Council was established in 2016 which comprises the former Bombala, Cooma-Monaro and Snowy River Local Government Areas. The area was traditionally inhabited by Ngarigo, Walgalu, Bidawal and Southern Ngunnawal people. It boasts of snowfields, expansive timber forests and the Snowy River.

Holden's 'Monaro' Coupe (and later sedan) models (1967-1977, 2001-2006, 1973-1974 (Sedan)) were named after the area.

Geography
The Monaro region is a plateau area lying about 1000 metres above sea level, extending from the valley of the Murrumbidgee River in the north to the Errinundra Plateau in the south, and dropping rather sharply to the coast on its eastern side. Much of the region is an ancient highland, but there is basaltic bedrock near Cooma and Nimmitabel that produce the only true chernozems in the whole continent, which are some of the best soils in Australia. Elsewhere the granitic soils are heavily leached and very infertile, supporting a dry forest vegetation before clearing for pastures. The Southern Tablelands Temperate Grassland is a vegetation community that lies in the region.

The Monaro region is characterised by rolling hills that rise to extremely rugged peaks in the Tinderry Mountains and to shallow valleys in the upper Murrumbidgee. The basaltic Monaro Range separates the Snowy and Murrumbidgee drainages. Because the climate in the basaltic areas is too cold for really reliable cropping (Nimmitabel has had frosts in January), the main industry is raising sheep and beef cattle.

Climate
Because it is located east of the Snowy Mountains, the rain-bearing westerly winds deposit rain and snow on the mountains leaving the Monaro region in a rain shadow (see southeast Australian foehn). Annual rainfall ranges from 430 millimetres (17 inches) around Dalgety to 700 millimetres (26 inches) at the eastern edge of the plateau, where occasional cyclonic storms can produce extremely heavy rainfall - in one day in June 1975 Nimmitabel received 256 millimetres (over 10 inches) of rain. 

Temperatures in summer are warm to very warm, with average maxima ranging from 28 °C (82 °F) around Canberra and Queanbeyan to 22 °C (71 °F) on the highest parts of the plateau. Nights in summer can be cool, but in winter the region is the coldest part of mainland Australia outside the Alps, with July minima averaging -0.3 °C (31.5 °F) in Canberra and -1.5 °C (29.3 °F) in Bombala.

Transport
The Monaro Highway is the main State highway which runs from Canberra south through the Monaro region.  Other major roads in the region are the Snowy Mountains Highway which crosses the Monaro between Tumut and Bega, the Kosciuszko Road from Cooma to Jindabyne, and the Snowy River Way from Bombala to Jindabyne.

Towns
The main towns in the region are Cooma, Jindabyne, Berridale and Bombala, whilst other towns and villages include Adaminaby, Delegate, Dalgety, Nimmitabel, Bredbo, Michelago, Maffra, Numeralla, and Cathcart. Larger localities within the Monaro include Shannons Flat, Yaouk, Eucumbene, Bunyan, Jerangle, Countegany and Kybeyan.

References

Regions of New South Wales
Great Dividing Range